Dubnička is a village and municipality in Bánovce nad Bebravou District in the Trenčín Region of north-western Slovakia.

History
In historical records the village was first mentioned in 1389.

Geography
The municipality lies at an altitude of 245 metres and covers an area of 8.109 km2. It has a population of about 72 people.

Genealogical resources

The records for genealogical research are available at the state archive "Statny Archiv in Nitra, Slovakia"

 Roman Catholic church records (births/marriages/deaths): 1740-1896 (parish B)

See also
 List of municipalities and towns in Slovakia

References

External links
  Official page
https://web.archive.org/web/20071027094149/http://www.statistics.sk/mosmis/eng/run.html
Surnames of living people in Dubnicka

Villages and municipalities in Bánovce nad Bebravou District